George James Phillips Vautin (23 April 1869 – 9 January 1949) was an Australian sportsman who played Australian rules football for the Essendon Football Club in the Victorian Football League (VFL) and first-class cricket for both Tasmania and Victoria.

Family
Vautin was born in Orielton, Tasmania and died in the Mercy Hospital in East Melbourne.

Football
Vautin was from Tasmania and played at the City Football Club in Hobart.  A rover, he represented his league in 1889 in an away series in Victoria, impressing the Essendon recruiters who signed him up for the 1892 VFA season and he was a key part of their premiership teams over the next three seasons. The VFL began in 1897 and Vautin was a member of Essendon's inaugural VFL premiership side.

Cricket
Vautin was also a cricketer, playing a first-class match for Tasmania in 1889/90 and another for Victoria in 1894/95. He played club cricket for East Melbourne Cricket Club and St Kilda Cricket Club during the 1890s.

See also
 The Footballers' Alphabet

Notes

References

 'Follower', "The Footballers' Alphabet", The Leader, (Saturday, 23 July 1898), p.17.
 Holmesby, Russell & Main, Jim (2014). The Encyclopedia of AFL Footballers: every AFL/VFL player since 1897 (10th ed.). Melbourne, Victoria: Bas Publishing. 
 Maplestone, M., Flying Higher: History of the Essendon Football Club 1872–1996, Essendon Football Club, (Melbourne), 1996. 
 The Tasmanian Mail, 7 May 1892

External links
 
 
 

1869 births
1949 deaths
Australian cricketers
Australian rules footballers from Tasmania
Tasmanian Football Hall of Fame inductees
Essendon Football Club players
Essendon Football Club Premiership players
Tasmania cricketers
Victoria cricketers
One-time VFL/AFL Premiership players